A self-inflicted wound (SIW), is the act of harming oneself where there are no underlying psychological problems related to the self-injury, but where the injurer wanted to take advantage of being injured.

Reasons to self-wound

Most self-inflicted wounds occur during wartime, for various reasons. 

Potential draftees may self-injure to have a health deferment to conscription. This was practiced as conscription abstinence by some Jewish conscripts in the Russian Empire.

In prisons and forced labour camps, people sometimes self-injure to avoid forced labor and spend time in the relatively less stressful conditions of the infirmary or barracks.

Types of wounds

Common wound types include a gun shot to the hand, arm, leg, or foot. A person can achieve the same effect by deliberately neglecting their health, e.g., by letting a minor wound become infected, or "forgetting" foot care in damp conditions that lead to fungal infections.

Punishments

In most militaries, self-inflicted wounds are considered a serious military offense. Most self-inflicted wounds go unrecognized, though consequences are often severe if caught.

In the British army during World War I, the maximum penalty for a self-inflicted wound ("Wilfully maiming himself with intent to render himself unfit for service" as it was described) under Section 18 of the Army Act 1881 was imprisonment, rather than capital punishment. In the British Army, 3,894 men were found guilty, and were sent to prison for lengthy periods.

In Nazi concentration camps, self-injury was dangerous as the incapacitated were often just executed, but in some lower-stringency camps it has indeed been documented.

History

Many self-inflicted wound reports during World War I placed soldiers under suspicion for injuries that could have been genuine accidents. During World War II, almost all armies (in particular, the Soviet Army and the Wehrmacht) had cases of self-inflicted injury.

References

Law of war
Self-harm